The Day of the Jackal (1971) is a political thriller novel by English author Frederick Forsyth about a professional assassin who is contracted by the OAS, a French dissident paramilitary organisation, to kill Charles de Gaulle, the President of France.

The novel received admiring reviews and praise when first published in 1971, and it received a 1972 Best Novel Edgar Award from the Mystery Writers of America. The novel remains popular, and in 2003 it was listed on the BBC's survey The Big Read.

The novel is historical fiction: The OAS, as described did exist and the book opens with an accurate depiction of the attempt to assassinate de Gaulle by Jean-Marie Bastien-Thiry on 22 August 1962. The subsequent plot, however, is fiction.

Plot summary

Part One: Anatomy of a Plot
The book begins in 1962 with the (historical) failed attempt on de Gaulle's life plotted by, among others, Lieutenant-Colonel Jean-Marie Bastien-Thiry in the Paris suburb of Petit-Clamart. Following the apprehension of Bastien-Thiry and various other conspirators, the French security forces wage a short but extremely vicious underground war with the terrorists of the OAS, a militant right-wing group who believe de Gaulle to be a traitor to France after his grant of independence to Algeria.

The French secret service, particularly its covert operations directorate (the Action Service), is remarkably effective in infiltrating the terrorist organisation with their own informants, allowing them to seize and interrogate the OAS operations commander, Antoine Argoud. The failure of the Petit-Clamart assassination, and a subsequent betrayal of the next attempt on de Gaulle's life at the École Militaire, compounded by Bastien-Thiry's eventual execution by firing squad, likewise demoralise the antagonists.

Argoud's deputy, Lt-Col Marc Rodin, carefully examines what few options they have remaining and establishes that the only way to succeed in killing de Gaulle is to hire a professional mercenary from outside the organisation, who is completely unknown to both the French government and the OAS itself. After extensive inquiries, he contacts an English hitman (whose true identity is always unknown), who meets with Rodin and his two principal deputies in Vienna, and agrees to assassinate de Gaulle, although he demands a total of US$500,000 (roughly US$ million as of  currency). The killer further requires that half of the amount be paid in advance and the rest on completion. They also choose a code name, "The Jackal". The triumvirate of OAS commanders then take up residency on the top floor of a hotel in Rome guarded by a group of ex-legionnaires to avoid the risk of being captured, like Argoud, and subsequently revealing the assassination plot under interrogation.

The remainder of this part describes the Jackal's exhaustive preparations for the forthcoming project. He first acquires a legitimate British passport under a fake name, "Alexander Duggan", which he intends to use for the majority of his operation. He then steals the passports of two foreign tourists visiting London who superficially resemble him for use as contingency identities. Masquerading as Duggan, the Jackal travels to Brussels, where he commissions a master gunsmith to build him a special suppressed sniper rifle of extreme slimness with a small supply of mercury-tipped explosive bullets. He also acquires a set of forged French identity papers from a professional forger. The latter makes the mistake of attempting to blackmail him, for which the Jackal kills him and locks his body in a large trunk where he determines it will not be found for a considerable time. After exhaustively researching a series of books and articles by, and about, de Gaulle, the Jackal travels to Paris to reconnoitre the most favourable spot and the best possible day for the assassination.

Following a series of armed robberies in France, the OAS is able to deposit the first half of the Jackal's fee in his Swiss bank account. Meanwhile, the French authorities, suspicious about Rodin and his subordinates being holed up in the hotel, composes and despatches a fake letter that lures Viktor Kowalski, one of Rodin's bodyguards (and a hulking giant) to France, where he is caught and tortured to reveal what he knows. Interpreting his incoherent ramblings, the secret service is able to decipher Rodin's plot, but knows nothing of the assassin himself bar his codename. When informed of the plan, de Gaulle (who was notoriously careless of his personal security) refuses to cancel any public appearances, modify his normal routines, or even allow any kind of public inquiry into the assassin's whereabouts to be made: any investigation, he orders, must be done in absolute secrecy.

Roger Frey, the French Minister of the Interior, organises a conference of the heads of the French security authorities. Because Rodin and his men are in a foreign hotel under heavy guard, kidnapping them for interrogation will be impossible (unless it is achieved through a commando-style operation), nor can they be executed. The rest of the meeting is at a loss to suggest how to proceed, until a Commissioner of the Police Judiciaire reasons that their first and most essential objective is to establish the Jackal's true identity, which is something that he insists is "pure detective work". When Frey asks him to name the best detective in France, he volunteers his own deputy commissioner: Claude Lebel.

Part Two: Anatomy of a Manhunt
Granted special emergency powers to conduct his investigation, Lebel does everything possible to uncover the Jackal's identity. He first calls upon his old boy network of foreign intelligence and police contacts to inquire if they have any records of a top-class political assassin. Most of the inquiries are fruitless, but in the United Kingdom, the matter is eventually passed on to the Special Branch of Scotland Yard, and another veteran detective, Superintendent Bryn Thomas.

A search through Special Branch's records turns up nothing. However, one of Thomas's subordinates suggests that if the assassin were an Englishman, but primarily operated abroad, he would most probably come to the attention of the Secret Intelligence Service. Thomas makes an informal inquiry with a friend of his on the SIS's staff, who mentions hearing a rumour from an officer stationed in the Dominican Republic at the time of President Trujillo's assassination. The rumour states that a hired assassin stopped Trujillo's car with a rifle shot, allowing a gang of partisans to finish him off. Additionally, Thomas also learns that the assassin was an Englishman, whom he identifies as a man named Charles Calthrop.

To his surprise, Thomas is summoned in person by the Prime Minister (unnamed, but most probably intended to represent Harold Macmillan), who informs him that word of his inquiries has reached higher circles in the British government. Despite the enmity felt by much of the government against France in general and de Gaulle in particular, the Prime Minister informs Thomas that de Gaulle is his friend, and that the assassin must be identified and stopped, with a limitless amount of resources, manpower or expenses at Thomas' disposal. Thomas is handed a commission similar to Lebel's, with temporary powers allowing him to override almost any other authority in the land. Checking out the name of Charles Calthrop, Thomas finds a match to a man living in London, said to be on holiday. While Thomas confirms that this Calthrop was indeed in the Dominican Republic at the time of Trujillo's death, he does not believe it justifies informing Lebel, until one of his junior detectives realises that the first three letters of his first name and surname form the French word for Jackal (Chacal).

Unknown to any member of the council in France, there is an OAS mole among them: the mistress of an arrogant Air Force colonel attached to de Gaulle's staff. Through pillow talk, the officer unwittingly feeds the Jackal a constant stream of information as to Lebel's progress. The Englishman enters France through Italy, driving a rented Alfa Romeo sports car with his weapon soldered/wired to the chassis. Although he receives word from the OAS agent that the French are on the lookout for him, he assesses that he will succeed whatever happens and decides to take the risk. In London, the Special Branch raids Calthrop's flat, finding his passport, and deduce that he must be travelling on a fake identity. When they discover that the Jackal is travelling in the name of Duggan, Lebel and a police force comes close to apprehending him in the south of France, but owing to his OAS contact, he leaves his hotel early and evades them by only an hour. With the police on the lookout for him, the Jackal seeks refuge in the château of a woman whom he encountered and seduced at the hotel: when she goes through his things and finds the weapon, he kills her and flees after disguising himself as the first of his two emergency identities. Before leaving this region of France, he disposes of Duggan's belongings in a ravine. The murder is not reported until much later that day, allowing him to board the train for Paris.

Part Three: Anatomy of a Kill
Having failed to capture the Jackal at least twice, Lebel becomes suspicious of what the rest of the council label the killer's apparent "good luck", and has the telephones of all the members tapped, which leads him to discover the OAS agent. The disgraced Air Force colonel withdraws from the meeting and subsequently tenders his resignation. When Thomas checks out and identifies reports of stolen or missing passports in London in the preceding months, he closes in on the Jackal's remaining secondary identities. 

During a council meeting on 22 August 1963, Lebel deduces that the killer has decided to target de Gaulle three days later on 25 August, which commemorates the liberation of Paris during World War II. It is, he realises, the one day of the year when de Gaulle can definitely be counted on to be in Paris and to appear in public. Believing the inquiry to be over, the Minister orchestrates a massive, citywide manhunt for the Jackal now that he can be publicly reported as a murderer, dismissing Lebel with hearty congratulations – but the killer eludes them yet again: slipping into a gay bar while disguised as his second contingency identity, he gets himself picked up by a local man and taken to his flat, where he kills him and waits out the remaining days.

On the 24th, the Minister summons Lebel yet again and tells him that the Jackal still cannot be found. The detective listens to the details of the President's schedule and security arrangements, but can suggest nothing more helpful than that everyone "should keep their eyes open", much to Roger Frey's dismay. On the 25th itself, the Jackal, masquerading as a one-legged French war veteran, passes through the security checkpoints carrying his custom gun concealed in the sections of a crutch. He makes his way to an apartment building overlooking the Place du 18 Juin 1940 (in front of the soon-to-be-demolished façade of the Gare Montparnasse), where de Gaulle is presenting medals to a small group of Resistance veterans. As the ceremony begins, Lebel is walking around the street, questioning and re-questioning every police checkpoint. When he hears from one CRS guard about a one-legged veteran with a crutch, he realises what the Jackal's plan is, and rushes into the apartment building, calling for the patrol to follow him.

Having sneaked into a suitable apartment to shoot from, the Jackal prepares his weapon and takes aim at de Gaulle's head, but his first shot misses by a fraction of an inch when the President unexpectedly leans forward to kiss the cheeks of the veteran he is honouring. Outside the apartment, Lebel and the CRS man arrive on the top floor in time to hear the sound of the first, silenced shot. The CRS guard shoots off the door lock and bursts in as the Jackal is reloading: the Englishman turns and fires, killing him with a shot to the chest. At this point, the detective and the assassin, having developed grudging respect for each other during the pursuit, stare at each other briefly. The Jackal scrambles to load his third and last bullet while the unarmed Lebel snatches up the dead policeman's submachine-gun: Lebel is faster and shoots the Jackal with half a magazine-load of 9mm bullets, instantly killing him.

Epilogue
In London, the Special Branch are searching Calthrop's apartment when the real Charles Calthrop storms in and demands to know what they are doing. Once it is established that Calthrop truly has been on holiday in Scotland and is totally separate to the killer, the British are left to wonder "if the Jackal wasn't Calthrop, then who the hell was he?"

The Jackal is buried in an unmarked grave in a Paris cemetery, officially recorded as "an unknown foreign tourist, killed in a car accident." Aside from a priest, a policeman, registrar and grave-diggers, the only other person attending the burial is Inspector Claude Lebel, who then leaves the cemetery to return to his family.

Origins

Over the three years immediately prior to his writing The Day of the Jackal, Frederick Forsyth spent most of his time in West Africa covering the Biafran war, first for the BBC in 1967 and then for another eighteen months as a freelance journalist in 1968–1969. Upon his return to Britain his first book, the non-fiction The Biafra Story: The Making of an African Legend about that brutal civil war during which Nigeria fought to prevent the secession of its eastern province, was published as a paperback by Penguin Books in late 1969. To Forsyth's disappointment, however, the book sold very few copies and so with the arrival of the 1970s the then 31 year-old freelance journalist, international adventurer, and onetime youngest (at 19) fighter pilot in the RAF found himself both out of work and "flat broke". To solve his financial problems he thus decided to try his hand at fiction by writing a political thriller as a "one-off" project to "clear his debts". Unlike most novelists, however, Forsyth would employ the same type of research techniques that he had used as an investigative reporter to bring a sense of increased reality to his work of fiction, a story which he first began to consider writing in 1962–1963 while posted to Paris as a young Reuters foreign correspondent.

When Forsyth arrived in 1962, French President Charles de Gaulle had just granted independence to Algeria to end the eight-year Algerian War, a highly controversial act that had incurred the wrath of the anti-decolonisation paramilitary group Organisation Armée Secrète (OAS) which then vowed to assassinate him. Forsyth befriended several of the President's bodyguards and personally reported from the scene of the failed August 1962 assassination attempt along the Avenue de la Libération during which de Gaulle and his wife narrowly escaped death in a fusillade of gunfire in the roadside ambush, the most serious of six overall attempts the OAS would make on his life. Forsyth incorporated an account of that real-life event to open his new novel throughout which he also employed many other aspects and details about France, its politics, the OAS, and international law enforcement that he had learned during his career as an investigative journalist. Forsyth noted that virtually all OAS members and sympathizers were known to, and under surveillance by, French authorities—a key factor in the failure of their assassination attempts. In his 2015 memoir The Outsider, Forsyth wrote that during his time in France he briefly considered that the OAS might assassinate de Gaulle if they hired a man or team who were completely unknown to French authorities — an idea he would later expand upon in Jackal.

Publishing history 

Although Forsyth wrote The Day of the Jackal in 35 days in January and February 1970, it remained unpublished for almost a year-and-a-half thereafter as he sought a publisher willing to accept his unsolicited approximately 140,000-word manuscript. Four publishing houses rejected it between February and September because their editors believed a fictional account of the OAS hiring a British assassin in 1963 to kill Charles de Gaulle would not be commercially successful, given the fact that he had never been shot and, when the book was written, de Gaulle was in fact still alive and retired from public life.

The editors told Forsyth that they felt that these well-known facts essentially abrogated the suspense of his fictional assassination plot against de Gaulle as readers would already know it would not and could not possibly have been successful. (De Gaulle subsequently died of natural causes at his country home in Colombey-les-Deux-Églises in November 1970 after peacefully retiring). After these rejections Forsyth took a different strategy and wrote a short summary of the novel to present to publishers, noting that the focus was not on the plausibility of the assassination itself, but rather on the technical details and manhunt. He persuaded London-based Hutchinson & Co. to take a chance on publishing his novel, however, they only agreed to a relatively small initial printing of just 8,000 copies for its 358-page red and gold clothbound first edition. Forsyth was signed to a three-book contract: a £500 advance for Jackal, followed by another £6,000 advance for the second and third novels. Although the book was not formally reviewed by the press prior to its initial June 1971 UK publication, widespread word of mouth discussion resulted in brisk advance and post-publication sales leading to repeated additional printings (including some prior to its official publication date) being ordered from Hutchinson's longtime printer, Anchor Press Ltd (Tiptree, Essex), to meet booksellers' unexpectedly strong demand.

The book's unexpected success in Britain soon attracted the attention of Viking Press in New York which quickly acquired the US publication rights for $365,000 (£100,000)—a then very substantial sum for such a work and especially for that of a first-time author. These fees (the equivalent of $ million in ) were split equally between Hutchinson and Forsyth, which led the heretofore self-described "flat broke" author to observe later that he had "never seen money like it and never thought I would." Just two months after its publication in the UK the 380-page clothbound Viking first edition was released in the US at $7.95 and with a distinctive jacket designed by noted American artist Paul Bacon.

The US first edition's launch was considerably aided by two glowing reviews in the New York Times by senior daily book reviewer Christopher Lehmann-Haupt three days before its release, and by the American mystery writer Stanley Bernard Ellin the week after. In mid-October it reached No. 1 on the Times "Best Seller List" for fiction and by mid-December 136,000 copies of Viking's US edition were already in print. Over two-and-a-half million copies were sold worldwide by 1975. As in the UK, over forty years later The Day of the Jackal still remains in print in the US published now by Penguin Books (which acquired Viking in 1975) as a New American Library imprint. Hundreds of other print, electronic, and audio editions have been produced around the world since 1971 with many more millions of copies now in print in both English and the thirty other languages to which it has been translated including Spanish, German, French, Russian, Turkish, Czech, Polish, Italian, Portuguese, Swedish, Finnish, Danish, Hebrew, Latvian, Chinese, Japanese, Korean, and Thai.

The Day of the Jackal was published in serial format in 1971 in both the London Evening Standard and Israel's oldest daily newspaper, Ha'aretz. Earning Forsyth the 1972 Edgar Allan Poe Award for Best Novel, in 1973 it was also made into a 143-minute feature film directed by Fred Zinnemann. In 2011 a number of special "40th Anniversary" editions of The Day of the Jackal were released in the UK, US, and elsewhere to commemorate the four decades of continuous success of the book, the first of 18 more Forsyth novels and collections of his short stories published since the 1971 release of his seminal debut thriller.

Film adaptations 
 The film The Day of the Jackal was released in 1973, directed by Fred Zinnemann and starring Edward Fox as The Jackal, Michael Lonsdale as Lebel, and Derek Jacobi as Caron. It follows the novel rather faithfully although it has several cosmetic changes
 An Indian film in Malayalam titled August 1 (1988), directed by Sibi Malayil, is loosely based on the novel. It stars Mammootty, Captain Raju and Sukumaran in pivotal roles.
 A film titled The Jackal, directed by Michael Caton-Jones, was released in 1997. The film bears little resemblance to the plot of the novel or the original film, featuring an unnamed assassin (Bruce Willis) being hired to kill the First Lady of the United States by the Russian mafia. Both Zinnemann and Forsyth lobbied to have the film's name changed to disassociate it from Forsyth's novel.

Television adaptation 
Sky and Peacock have been ordered a television adaptation of the novel with Ronan Bennett as showrunner and Brian Kirk as director.

Influence on later events 
The method for acquiring a false identity and UK passport detailed in the book is often referred to as the "Day of the Jackal fraud" and remained a well known security loophole in the UK until 2007. The New Zealand Member of Parliament David Garrett claimed the novel's description of identity theft inspired him to create his own fake passport as a "youthful prank". The incident further inflamed a national controversy over the law and order campaigner's criminal history.

In 1975, the Venezuelan terrorist Carlos was dubbed "The Jackal" by The Guardian after one of its correspondents reportedly spotted the novel  near some of the fugitive's belongings.

A copy of the Hebrew translation of The Day of the Jackal was found in possession of Yigal Amir, the Israeli who in 1995 assassinated Yitzhak Rabin, Prime Minister of Israel.

Would-be assassin Vladimir Arutinian, who attempted to kill US President George W. Bush during his 2005 visit to the Republic of Georgia, was an obsessive reader of the novel and kept an annotated version of it during his planning for the assassination.

See also 
 Citroën DS
 Cordite, which the assassin ingests to appear ill
 The Jackal

Notes

References

External links 

 Frederick Forsyth discusses The Day of the Jackal on the BBC World Book Club
 The Day of the Jackal at FactBehindFiction.com 
 The Way of the Jackal 

1971 British novels
Books with cover art by Paul Bacon
British crime novels
British novels adapted into films
Edgar Award-winning works
Novels by Frederick Forsyth
Novels set in Paris
Novels set in the 1960s
Political thriller novels
Secret histories
British thriller novels
Hutchinson (publisher) books
Novels about secret societies
Fiction about the Organisation armée secrète
Cultural depictions of Charles de Gaulle
Novels set in London
Novels set in Italy
Novels set in Belgium
British political novels
1971 debut novels